Vitomir Dimitrijević (born 11 December 1948) is a Serbian former professional footballer who played as a midfielder. He spent three seasons in the North American Soccer League, making 59 appearances for the New York Cosmos and the Los Angeles Aztecs in the late 1970s.

References

Association football midfielders
Expatriate soccer players in the United States
FK Radnički Niš players
Los Angeles Aztecs players
New York Cosmos players
NK Olimpija Ljubljana (1945–2005) players
NK Svoboda Ljubljana players
North American Soccer League (1968–1984) players
Serbian footballers
Yugoslav expatriate footballers
Yugoslav expatriates in the United States
Yugoslav First League players
Yugoslav footballers
1948 births
Living people